Maritime cocaine smuggling refers to the practice which involves the smuggling of cocaine between borders via maritime means. According to the United Nations Office on Drugs and Crime (UNODC), there are an estimated 18 million users of cocaine globally. Approximately 70-80% of cocaine is at some point smuggled across the ocean, originating from South America. Cocaine remains the "highest value criminal commodity for transnational organised crime", motivating the criminal organisations responsible for maritime smuggling practices. Maritime cocaine smuggling is therefore an ongoing international issue, as criminal organisations are finding new and innovative ways of smuggling cocaine and go undetected by authorities.

Historical Overview 
Cocaine has been an illicit and abused substance for many years. Coca leaves, the source of cocaine, were previously (and still are) used in the Andes for the sole purpose of religious ceremonies. But, after the invasion of the Spanish and the exportation of coca leaves to the colonies, cocaine was used for both medicinal and recreational purposes. From the late 1800s to the early 1900s, cocaine was a popular drug widely used by the white middle-class. However, once use in society grew and the dangers of cocaine became evident, the use and sale of coca products were outlawed with the Harrison Narcotics Act in the United States in 1914, one of the first examples of drug legislation. From then on, the cocaine trade became a strictly illegal network. It was not until the 1970s that Colombian drug cartels set up their smuggling network to get cocaine into the United States.

Drug Cartels 
Cocaine smuggling was previously dominated by drug cartels, particularly from Colombia. Notorious cocaine cartels such as Medellin cartel and Cali cartel have both dominated the illicit cocaine trade as well as their country of Colombia. Very early on, these cartels identified the weakness of authorities in the maritime domain and used this to their advantage. In addition to this, the lack of understanding of government administrations of the cartel structure and widespread influence has led to the speculation that this was a leading cause of the crack cocaine epidemic in the United States during the 1980s and 1990s.

The disintegration of these top cocaine cartels in Colombia in the late 1990s have paved the way for insurgent groups to take over. For example, the National Liberation Army (ELN) and the Revolutionary Armed Forces of Colombia (FARC), are both currently key actors in the cocaine trade from Colombia. Whilst cocaine cartels are still active today, they are not as prevalent or as active as they were in the late 1900s.

Key Routes 
Based on reported seizures, main cocaine trafficking routes have been mapped out by the UNODC. These routes are primarily in line with commercial shipping routes as this is one of the major methods that smugglers use to get mass amounts of cocaine across borders.

Key points of origin of maritime cocaine smuggling still remain to be from mainly Colombia, as well as Bolivia and Peru. From here, a large volume goes to Brazil, Mexico and Central America, the Caribbean, and Western and Central Europe. Mexico and Central America are used as transit countries for the high quantity of cocaine headed to the United States. Brazil is a major destination and transit country for cocaine smugglers and this supply goes onto Western and Central Europe, South Africa, West and Central Africa and South Asia. The Caribbean and Central America are also transit countries for the large quantity directed for Western and Central Europe. Spain is a highly used transit and destination country in Europe, which have major flows through to France, Belgium, Germany, the Netherlands and the United Kingdom. From West/Central Europe there is a medium supply of cocaine through to Eastern Europe, the Middle East and South-West Asia. Countries in West, Central and South Africa are used as a transit for the flow of cocaine to Italy in particular. Medium volumes of cocaine go directly from South America to East and South-East Asia and Oceania, Australia in particular.

Methods and techniques 
Smuggling cocaine has become increasingly innovative as criminal organisations try to avoid detection by authorities. These methods are primarily via the maritime using maritime cargo, containers and vessels.

Most commonly, cocaine smugglers hide cocaine within other products that are arriving to another country as "commercial" products in shipping containers. Examples of this include inside concrete blocks, fruits, vehicles, in the insulation of container ships, mixing the cocaine with liquid products and soaking liquid cocaine in fabrics such as clothing.

Another commonality is creating an operational business to disguise the mass shipments. Notorious drug lord Joaquin 'El Chapo' Guzman is one of many who have mixed legitimate business with their drug activities in order to conceal their illicit trading. El Chapo opened a cannery in Mexico and began producing canned jalapeños and peppers, and stuffed them with cocaine.

Another popular smuggling technique is the "rear rip" or "rear rip-off" method. This involves the cocaine being stored in the rear door of the container so it can be quickly identified by smugglers or corrupt dock workers, and extracted before going through customs.

Narco submarines 

Submarine vessels are a common method that cocaine smugglers use to avoid detection. These are frequently used by major Colombian cocaine smuggling organisations and are commonly referred to as the "narco submarine".

The first narco submarine was not intercepted until 2006 by the US Navy off of Costa Rica holding 3.5 tonnes of cocaine. Despite rumours of submarines being used by cartels in the 1990s, this was the first detection.

The number of narco submarine incidents has risen in recent years. The US Coast Guard reported 35 in 2018 and 36 in 2019. United States authorities have admitted they have no idea just how many of these narco submarines go undetected.

Key Responses 
Since 9/11, countries have shown an increased response and focus to maritime security related issues as threats to ports became a concern. This has created an increased focus and recognition of the role of the maritime in cocaine smuggling. The UNODC has been a major actor in the response to combatting maritime cocaine smuggling at an international level. The UNODC has found that corruption and weak law enforcement capacity are key factors in keeping the supply chain of cocaine smuggling resilient. The UNODC has recognised the maritime as a popular domain due to the lack of jurisdiction on the high seas. Therefore, international cooperation is the crucial tool to counter maritime cocaine smuggling based on the principle of "shared and common responsibility".

United States Response 
The United States government has gone for a more invasive approach to the issue of maritime cocaine smuggling. Rather than relying solely on the US Coast Guard and customs to detect cocaine being smuggling into the country, the United States government is intervening in Colombia. The United States has provided military hardware and training to the Colombian military, aiming to reduce the quantity of cocaine directed towards the United States. In addition to this, the United States government is also providing infrastructure to Colombia in order to assist in fighting insurgency in the country created by FARC and ELN.

The Port of Rotterdam 
Being one of the largest ports in Europe, the Port of Rotterdam sees extortionate amounts of smuggled cocaine. The high volume of shipments coming through, as well as the geographical location and access to the European market creates an appeal for cocaine smugglers. In 2019, more than 23 thousands kilograms of cocaine was seized at the Port of Rotterdam, a 28 percent increase from 2018. Fruit, especially bananas, a common Latin American export, is the most common method seen to smuggle cocaine into Europe.

The Port of Rotterdam has a specialised team of divers whose purpose is to find smuggled drugs, the Dutch Customs Diving Team (CDT). The unique border policing is done under the water line as cocaine is not only smuggled onboard, but under vessels as well.

Notable Seizures 
Large seizures of cocaine are not only a success for local and national authorities in getting cocaine off the streets, but also prevent it from continuing the illegal supply chain to other countries.

United States 
In 2019, United States customs seized over 15 tonnes of cocaine from a ship at a Philadelphia port (estimated street value US$1.1 billion).

Germany 
In 2019, German authorities in Hamburg seized 1.5 tonnes of cocaine at a port in Hamburg. The cocaine was found in shipping containers containing soybeans that were concealing 221 sports bags full of cocaine. The shipping containers were from Uruguay and were bound for Antwerp, Belgium.

Costa Rica 
In early 2020, police in Costa Rica found more than 5 tonnes of cocaine in a shipping container. They discovered 202 suitcases containing cocaine hidden in a consignment of flowers. The shipping containers were headed for the Netherlands. The country has seen a surge in drug smugglers using their country to move cocaine to the United States and Europe.

Australia 
In 2017, an Australian Federal Police (AFP) investigation led to the seizure of 1.4 tonnes of cocaine, the largest seizure of a single cocaine shipment in Australian history. The group of men responsible travelled from New Zealand to a 'mothership' in the South Pacific Ocean on a yacht where they collected the cocaine and attempted to sail into Australia, but were intercepted on the south coast of Australia. The investigation and seizure was supported by authorities in New Zealand, Fiji and French Polynesia.

References 

Cocaine trafficking
Smuggling
Maritime transport
Water transport
Illegal drug trade techniques